FC Prut Leova was a Moldovan football club based in Leova, Moldova. It was founded in 1992 as Constructorul Leova, and played in the inaugural edition of the Moldovan National Division in 1992. In 1999 the club was renamed as FC Prut Leova.

References

External links
 FC Prut Leova at WeltFussballArchive 
 FC Prut Leova at soccerway

Football clubs in Moldova
Association football clubs established in 1992
Association football clubs disestablished in 2017
Defunct football clubs in Moldova